From March 10 to June 2, 1964, voters of the Republican Party elected 1,308 delegates to the 1964 Republican National Convention through a series of delegate selection primaries and  caucuses, for the purpose of determining the party's nominee for president in the 1964 United States presidential election.

Senator Barry Goldwater of Arizona was selected as the nominee at the 1964 Republican National Convention held from July 13 to July 16, 1964, in San Francisco, California.

Background

1952 nomination

In 1952, the Republican nomination was contested between Senator Robert A. Taft, a leading conservative, and Supreme Allied Commander Dwight D. Eisenhower. Eisenhower's candidacy was generated by a draft of the party's so-called "Eastern Establishment," led by Thomas E. Dewey and Henry Cabot Lodge Jr., and narrowly secured when Dewey and Lodge out-maneuvered Taft in pre-convention delegate credential fights. Eisenhower won the general election and was re-elected in 1956.

The bitterly close 1952 convention result, predicated in part on the presumption that Taft was too extreme to win the general election, and Eisenhower's re-election meant that conservative Republicans had not occupied the White House since at least 1929 or won the Republican nomination since at least 1936. The memory of 1952, the last contested Republican nomination, remained fresh in the minds of all parties as the 1964 primaries approached.

1960 presidential election

In 1960, the party's nomination was easily secured for Vice President Richard Nixon. Nixon, who had relatively conservative credentials as an anti-communist Congressman and Senator from California, was acceptable to all branches of the party. His only serious challenge came from Nelson Rockefeller, the free-spending Governor of New York and heir to both the Rockefeller family fortune and Dewey's position as leader of the moderate party establishment.

Though Rockefeller lacked the broad appeal to take the nomination himself, he could potentially marshal enough delegates to deny Nixon the nomination at the convention. On July 22, Nixon and Rockefeller met at the latter's Fifth Avenue penthouse. In over four hours of negotiations, the two sides reached an agreement for fourteen points in the party platform, generally committing Nixon to greater spending on defense and education, opposition to racial segregation, and a flexible internationalist outlook on foreign policy. The so-called Compact of Fifth Avenue was reviled by conservatives, who unsuccessfully attempted to draft Senator Barry Goldwater of Arizona, an occasional Eisenhower critic who opposed the deal, as Nixon's running mate; at the convention, Goldwater declined to run.

Nixon narrowly lost the ensuing general election to Senator John F. Kennedy. Kennedy, the first Roman Catholic elected President and a supporter of federal enforcement of equal civil rights for African Americans, performed relatively poorly in the heavily-Protestant South. While the region had been a Democratic stronghold since the end of Reconstruction, Kennedy's only convincing majority there was in the state of Georgia. He lost both Tennessee and Florida to Nixon and only narrowly won North Carolina, South Carolina, and Texas. In Arkansas, Alabama, Mississippi, and Louisiana, dissident members of his own party fielded unpledged slates of electors. Thus, despite Nixon's loss, the Republican Party entered the Kennedy administration with hopes of finding new support in the formerly Democratic South.

Draft Goldwater Committee

The earliest movements toward the 1964 nomination were made on behalf of Senator Barry Goldwater of Arizona, against his express wishes, by a group composed mostly of Young Republicans and led by F. Clifton White, a longtime party activist from upstate New York. At a secret meeting in Chicago on October 8, 1961, White proposed a plan whereby, partly thanks to the reallocation of delegates toward the conservative South and Midwest, a candidate could secure the nomination without the support of New York or New England. The group agreed to organize throughout the country and began fundraising.

In spring 1962, they leased a Manhattan office in the Chanin Building. The address of their office, Suite 3505, became the informal temporary name of their campaign.

Goldwater had a personal audience with White in January 1963 and urged him to drop the draft effort. Instead, the group went public in February as the "Draft Goldwater Committee."

Nelson Rockefeller marriage
Though conservatives organized behind the unwilling Goldwater, the leading candidate for the nomination in early 1963 was Nelson Rockefeller. Rockefeller began to campaign around the country and was well-received in on a spring tour of the Midwest, though he stopped Goodwin Knight from establishing a California campaign office before he had decided to run. He led most polling over Goldwater through the spring.

However, Rockefeller's popularity plummeted when he remarried on May 4. Rockefeller had been divorced from Mary Todhunter Clark for about one year. His new wife, Margaretta Large "Happy" Filter, was eighteen years his junior, had previously worked as a member of his office staff, and been married to Rockefeller's close friend, with four children, just one month prior. They then left for a honeymoon in Venezuela and the Virgin Islands. 

The marriage was instantly the subject of scrutiny and criticism from the press, fellow Republicans, and even the Presbyterian Church in America. Senator Prescott Bush of Connecticut, speaking at a prep school graduation, asked, "Have we come to the point in our life as a nation where the governor of a great state can desert a good wife, mother of his grown children, divorce her, then persuade a mother of youngster to abandon her husband and their four children and marry the governor?" When the Rockefellers attended the National Federation of Republican Women convention later that year, by then a loyal Goldwater organization, they received a silent reception, and several women staged a walk-out. Others publicly criticizing the marriage included Reinhold Niebuhr and Nikita Khrushchev. In Gallup polling, Rockefeller lost a seventeen-point lead in polling and trailed Goldwater by five points. Any conservative support he had gained was gone.

Later developments
The Republican Citizens Committee, a caucus of moderate Republicans, had decided by July 16 not to support Rockefeller.  Rockefeller plowed ahead anyway, and on September 16 he announced that former Gov. Hugh Gregg of New Hampshire was on his team to help direct his efforts in the first primary. 

Goldwater headquarters were being informally opened in critical states by mid-1963; his Oregon office opened on June 20,  and in the summer he was leading in some opinion polls among Republicans. The New York Times reported on July 7 that a movement was underfoot in the northeast for "favorite sons" to run in state primaries to prevent a Goldwater nomination, since they feared major losses with Goldwater.

A conference of western Republicans was held in Eugene, Oregon on October 12. Both Rockefeller and Goldwater attended. Rockefeller challenged Goldwater to a debate on "how our party can best deal with the vital issues before the American people today." Goldwater said he did not favor a Republican debate, which he believed would tarnish the party's unity. Rockefeller began his semi-official campaigning soon thereafter. He spent two days in New Hampshire, visiting with local Republicans and answering the question how he would govern differently from President John F. Kennedy.  The following week, Henry C. Lodge declined to enter the New Hampshire primary, apparently opening the way for Rockefeller to consolidate moderate Republicans there against Goldwater.  On November 7, Rockefeller became the first candidate to officially enter the race. 

The assassination of President Kennedy on November 22 rattled the Republican field. Senator Goldwater was attending the funeral of his mother-in-law when he heard the news. Governors Rockefeller and Scranton announced a one-month period of mourning.  During this month, Republican leaders looked at the electoral map to see if Goldwater could win. At the time, they reasoned that Goldwater would probably be locked out of the northeast and would split the South with Lyndon Johnson. On December 7, former president Dwight Eisenhower called on Lodge to enter the race as a compromise candidate.

Schedule and results

Candidates

Major candidates

Favorite sons
The following candidates ran only in their state's own primary, for the purpose of controlling the delegate slate at the 1964 Convention:
 Representative John W. Byrnes of Wisconsin
Senator Hiram Fong of Hawaii
Governor Jim Rhodes of Ohio

Declined to run 
 Former Vice President Richard Nixon of California
 Governor George Romney of Michigan
 Governor Mark Hatfield of Oregon
 Former Military Governor of the U.S. Occupation Zone in Germany Lucius D. Clay of New York
 Aviator Charles Lindbergh of Connecticut

Polling

National polling

The campaign

New Hampshire primary
The first test for the candidates came in the New Hampshire primary. There, a poll a few weeks before the primary showed that 60% of the Republicans had not made up their minds. The stakes were quite high. Goldwater's staff wanted to soft-pedal his right-wing philosophy there. He did say that he wanted to use a newly revealed spy plane for reconnaissance over the Soviet Union, and he denied rumors that he would abolish the Social Security program.  Goldwater spent twenty-one days campaigning continuously in New Hampshire, leaving the state on March 7 with the prediction "I have it made." For part of that time, he campaigned while wearing a cast (he had surgery on his right foot to remove a calcium spur). One reason for his optimism was that moderate Republicans were divided three ways: among Rockefeller and write-in efforts for Lodge and Nixon.  The movement for Lodge received a boost the day before the primary when it was announced that Lodge did not have his name removed from the Oregon primary ballot.  This bit of information was received as a declaration of candidacy for moderate Republicans, and in a record turnout they gave him a solid victory with 36% of the vote to 22% for Goldwater, 21% for Rockefeller, and 17% for Nixon. The voters on the sleety and snowy primary day also selected a solid slate of delegates pledged to Lodge, defeating several well-known state politicians.

Northeast primaries

In the four-week lull after New Hampshire, Goldwater and Rockefeller both worked on trying to win endorsements in various states. Both worked on a Republican volunteer organization in California, where the two were scheduled to appear on the ballot in the primary on June 2. The Field Research Associates released a poll showing Lodge in the lead in the state with 31% to 25% for Goldwater, 21% for Nixon, and just 12% for Rockefeller. Upon hearing the poll results, Goldwater said that Lodge would not do what was needed to win the nomination, and if chosen he would not work hard enough to win the election.  Soon thereafter, both Gallup and Harris released polls showing Lodge as the front-runner with Nixon second and Goldwater a poor third.  Scranton stated on April 10 that he was not a candidate, thus reducing the field.

Illinois 
Illinois held its primary on April 14. With the state Republican leadership almost solidly behind Goldwater, only Margaret C. Smith chose to file for the primary against Goldwater. During the campaign, Nixon and Lodge asked followers not to mount a campaign there. Goldwater defeated Smith 62-25%, which was far and away Smith's best primary performance. Lodge placed third on write-ins and Nixon fourth.  The delegate count: Goldwater 159, Rockefeller 90, Lodge 14.

New Jersey 
New Jersey voted on April 21. No candidates filed, so all votes were write-ins. Lodge again placed first with 42% to Goldwater 28%, Nixon 22%, and only 8% for all others. Massachusetts and Pennsylvania voted on April 28. No candidate appeared on the ballot in either. On the day before the two primaries, Rockefeller took the controversial stand of calling for US air strikes into Laos and Cambodia to help the government of South Vietnam.  Lodge won Massachusetts with 77% of the vote to 10% for Goldwater and only 6% for Nixon. Scranton won his home state with 52% to Lodge 21%, Nixon 10%, and Goldwater 9%. It was clear that the Republican voters were not lining up behind either Goldwater or Rockefeller, who at this point had won together just 35% of the primary vote. In fact, if Illinois is taken out of the numbers, Lodge had received three write-in votes for every Goldwater vote at this stage of the campaign, with Nixon's write-ins very close behind Goldwater.

Texas to Florida

Another large chunk of delegates was chosen in the month following the Pennsylvania primary. During this time, eight states held primaries. Rockefeller recognized that the stakes were higher than ever; he was only mounting a serious campaign in two. He attacked Goldwater as irresponsible and extreme, a candidate who would ruin the Republican Party.  Rockefeller also publicly chastised the supporters of Lodge. Since moderate Republicans were dividing their primary votes among Rockefeller, Lodge, and Scranton, they were allowing Goldwater to win many delegates he otherwise would not win. Campaigning in West Virginia, Rockefeller said that Lodge was "a person who isn't there, who says nothing on any issues". 

Goldwater spent the early part of the month in the South. He won 75% of the vote in the first Republican presidential primary in Texas. That same day, his supporters pushed the small cadre of black voters out of the Georgia Republican Party, taking 22 out of the 24 national delegates.  Goldwater supporters the following day forced through Tennessee's first all-white delegation to the Republican National Convention in half a century.  With these delegate appointments, the AP estimated that Goldwater had 209 delegates; uncommitted was second with 143 to Scranton 63, Lodge 43, and 55 for others. Rockefeller had not won a single delegate at the time.  Four states held mostly uncontested primaries in the following two weeks; Goldwater won Indiana and Nebraska, Rockefeller won West Virginia, and Governor Rhodes won his home state of Ohio.

The Oregon primary was held on May 15. As one of the most important primaries of the year, all candidates spent time trying to win the state. Lodge took the lead in Oregon opinion polls soon after the New Hampshire primary, but Rockefeller pressed on Lodge's supporters to abandon him for not taking a stand against Goldwater. The primary was widely seen as a precursor to the California primary, which Goldwater needed to win in order to have a majority of convention delegates. Two days before Oregon voted, a California poll showed Goldwater leading Rockefeller there by 43-27%.  The poll precipitated a critical Rockefeller win in the Oregon primary. Rockefeller placed first with 33%, followed by Lodge with 28%, Goldwater with 18%, and Nixon with 17%.

In the latter half of the month, Goldwater continued to move towards the nomination. The only contested primary was in Florida, where a slate of uncommitted delegates unexpectedly defeated a Goldwater slate. However, AP estimated on May 24 that Goldwater led with 304 delegates. Scranton was second with 70, followed by Rhodes with 58. Lodge had 44, and Rockefeller had 39; the uncommitted total was 224. The estimate was published the same day that Goldwater supporters were easily defeated in Alaska.

California and South Dakota

Senator Goldwater's overall strategy was to lock up the delegate votes from the South and the West. If he could win California, he would be able to win the presidential nomination on the first ballot. His support in California public opinion polls remained a steady 43% throughout the spring, not deterred by his under-performance in primary after primary. Even when Lodge's supporters agreed to join Rockefeller in California in a "stop Goldwater" move,  the polls only showed a minimal gain for Rocky.  With both candidates campaigning full-time, both drawing large crowds of interested Republicans, the division in the party was quite apparent. Another thing became clear: the California voters finally began shifting to Rocky, who took the lead in opinion polls in the week preceding the primary.  As often happens in politics, a mostly unrelated event took place that changed everything. On May 30, Margaretta Rockefeller had a baby son. Newspaper coverage included the information that Margaretta had worked on Rockefeller's staff before the two of them divorced their long-time spouses to marry each other. This was not new information, but it had been mostly forgotten by the voters. 

Just over two million people voted in California's Republican primary, approximately one third of all nationwide votes in the Republican primaries of 1964. CBS used computers to sample the data collected from various polling places to announce at 7:22 p.m. Pacific time that Goldwater would win the race.  Other news organizations were slower to make that prediction, and at one point Rockefeller took the lead temporarily. In the end, Goldwater won the California primary by 3%. Goldwater addressed supporters as the networks showed him in the lead; he said "This is a victory not for Barry Goldwater, but for the mainstream of Republican thinking".  By gaining the 86 delegates from California, he was just 30 delegates short of a majority. South Dakota chose 14 delegates on the same day as California, but an uncommitted slate easily defeated a Goldwater slate by a 2:1 margin.

With all primaries held, Senator Goldwater was just a few small steps away from the presidential nomination. He had won 38% of the vote in the primaries, but his organization's successful work in non-primary states meant that he had 49% of the delegates. Gov. Rockefeller won 22% of the primary vote, 75% of which came from California. The favorite son candidates and unofficial candidates won 40% of the vote - more than either of the two leading candidates and a sign that the Republican faithful were remarkably dissatisfied with their choices.

National Convention

Post-primary maneuvering

Moderate Republicans moved into action as it appeared more and more likely that Goldwater was headed for a first ballot victory. Senator Hugh Scott started a movement to draft Governor Scranton on June 6, hoping that Scranton could pull together all the liberal and moderate Republicans.  The following day, Scranton stopped to visit former President Eisenhower while on his way to the National Governors Conference in Cleveland; Ike encouraged Scranton to officially enter the race.  Scranton finally joined the race on June 12.  Rockefeller dropped out on June 15 and endorsed Scranton. 

In the background, local Republicans continued to choose their national convention delegates. In the week between June 7 and June 13, 13 states chose 225 delegates.  The many uncommitted delegates began to slowly announce their intentions; on June 9, 16 from Florida announced for Goldwater.

Scranton made a swing throughout the nation to speak with as many delegates as possible. Scranton gradually worked the moderate delegates who preferred Goldwater to Rockefeller and won endorsements in Ohio and Maryland.  Michigan's Governor Romney announced that the state's delegation would meet separately with Goldwater and Scranton before deciding how to vote. Romney hoped the delegation would remain uncommitted.  A staunch supporter of the Civil Rights Bill, Romney claimed that Goldwater's nomination would lead to the "suicidal destruction of the Republican Party".

On occasion, Goldwater returned to the Senate for votes. He gave a speech on June 18 in which he stated that he would vote against the Civil Rights bill. Senator Keating said that Goldwater's position was a repudiation of Abraham Lincoln and founding principles of the Republican Party.  Governor Scranton held large rallies in eastern states while visiting with the delegates; he decried Goldwater's position on civil rights  and challenged Goldwater to a debate, which Goldwater dismissed as "ridiculous".  With time slipping away, and with Scranton failing to gain ground, he purchased a 30-minute time segment on NBC that aired on July 7 (replacing an episode of "Moment of Fear," a program starring Ronald Reagan).  When the program aired, Scranton was unable to set forth his policy differences with Goldwater and spent too much time discussing smears from the Goldwater forces.

The Cow Palace

The 28th Republican National Convention was held in the Cow Palace, Daly City CA, from July 13 to July 16. The Cow Palace had been constructed in 1941, and the 1956 Republican National Convention had been held there. Following a $3 million improvement project in 1963, the Cow Palace applied to host the national convention and was chosen by Republican leaders over Chicago, Miami Beach, and four other cities. 

As the convention opened, the delegates ignored the turmoil among Republican ranks elsewhere in the nation. AP polled all delegates and found that Goldwater had a comfortable majority of them,  even as a Gallup poll showed Scranton leading Goldwater among nationwide Republicans by a 60-34% margin. Goldwater rejected a last offer by Scranton to debate, and Senator Margaret C. Smith arrived at the convention still campaigning for delegate support. 

The convention was organized at the first session. RNC Chairman William E. Miller called the convention to order at 10:00 a.m. Pacific Time on 7/13. The delegates were greeted by various party officials with short speeches. Delegate Newton I. Steers of Maryland introduced a resolution that would ban any delegate or alternate chosen with racially discriminatory procedures, but it was voted down.

The evening session was devoted to speeches. RNC Chairman Miller prophesied that Republicans would have a "fair" convention and would win the fall election. Senator Everett Dirksen read a letter from former President Hoover, who was in failing health. Two actors read patriotic statements from earlier politicians while "America the Beautiful" played in the background. Oregon Governor Mark Hatfield then delivered the keynote address. He set forth the party's case for defeating LBJ and spoke out against extremism and the "bigots in this nation who spew forth their venom of hate."

The second day was consumed with speeches and the platform vote. The convention was formally organized in the morning, with Senator Morton giving a speech "laying" the "dirty linen" of the Johnson administration on the line. President Eisenhower encouraged stronger local government and discouraged extremism. That evening, the entire platform was read during prime time. When finished, Senator Hugh Scott offered the first amendment at 10:00 p.m., condemning the Ku Klux Klan, the Communist Party, and the John Birch Society. Governor Rockefeller sought to address the convention on this amendment, and this is when the Goldwater delegates issued their loud "boos" to drown him out. The convention took a standing vote to defeat the measure. Scott then offered a stronger civil rights plank, which was defeated 897-409. Goldwater supporters voted down several other minor amendments, and at 12:36 a.m., the proposed platform was approved.

The presidential nomination

On the third day of the convention, the presidential nominations and balloting took place. Senator Dirksen placed Goldwater in nomination. Goldwater delegates held a 30-minute demonstration at the end of his speech. Senator Kenneth B. Keating nominated Gov. Rockefeller, and a state senator nominated Senator Hiram Fong. Senator George D. Aiken placed Margaret C. Smith in nomination, saying that she was "the best qualified person you ever voted for" as he made history by being the first person to place the name of a woman into the presidential nomination by a major party. Ike's brother Milton Eisenhower placed Governor Scranton in nomination, hoping that "these perilous days" would not grant the Republican Party the same fate as the Whig Party of the preceding century. Representative Gerald R. Ford placed Governor Romney in nomination, calling him "Michigan's leading citizen." Judd and Lodge were then placed in nomination, though Morton read a letter from Lodge, who wished for his name to be withdrawn.

The roll call followed. Goldwater took the lead with Alabama and never lost it. When South Carolina was called, the chairman realized that his state would put Goldwater over the top. The chairman said "we are humbly grateful that we can do this for America." At the end of the ballot, Goldwater had 883 votes to just 214 for Scranton, 114 for Rockefeller, and 97 for all others. Most delegates switched their votes to Goldwater. Then Governor Scranton took the stage. He called for the nomination to be made unanimous, calling on his supporters "not to desert our party but to strengthen it."

The presidential tally was as follows:

Vice presidential nomination and close

Nominee

The last day of the convention wrapped up the business. First was the vice presidential ballot. Charles H. Percy, candidate for governor of Illinois, placed RNC Chairman William E. Miller into nomination for vice president. Miller was well known for his debating skills in the U.S. House, where he had been one of LBJ's harshest critics. He also came from New York State, an attempt by Goldwater to show support for his policies in the northeast. Miller was nominated with 1,305 votes to three abstentions from Tennessee from delegates who believed that the convention should have had the ability to nominate whomever they wanted. Miller gave a short speech accepting "the greatest challenge of my lifetime."

Richard Nixon then introduced Goldwater for his acceptance speech. He said "Before this convention, we were Goldwater Republicans, Rockefeller Republicans, Scranton Republicans, Lodge Republicans, but now that this convention has met and made its decision, we are Republicans, period, working for Barry Goldwater for President of the United States."

In his acceptance speech, Goldwater set forth the "cause of Republicanism." His most famous passage was "Today ... the task of preserving and enlarging freedom at home and of safeguarding it from the forces of tyranny abroad is great enough to challenge all our resources and to re-fire all our strength. Anyone who wants to join us in all sincerity, we welcome. Those who do not care for our cause, we don't expect to enter our ranks in any case. And let our Republicanism, so focused and so dedicated, not be made fuzzy and futile by un-thinking and stupid labels. I would remind you that extremism in the defense of liberty is no vice. And let me remind you also that moderation in the pursuit of justice is no virtue." For many GOP moderates, Goldwater's speech was seen as a deliberate insult, and many of these moderates would defect to the Democrats in the fall election.

See also
1964 Democratic Party presidential primaries

References

Bibliography

Further reading
 Annunziata, Frank. "The Revolt Against the Welfare State: Goldwater Conservatism and the Election of 1964." Presidential Studies Quarterly 10.2 (1980): 254-265. online
 
  by Goldwater's speechwriter
 
 Shadegg, Stephen. What Happened to Goldwater? The Inside Story of the 1964 Republican Campaign (Holt, Rinehart and Winston, 1965).
 White, F. Clifton. Suite 3505: The Story of the Draft Goldwater Movement (Arlington House, 1967).